Fath Union Sport commonly called FUS or FUS Rabat, is a Moroccan basketball club based in Rabat. The team currently plays in the Division Excellence and is the basketball section of the multi-sports club. The team is the most successful in Moroccan history, with 17 national titles.

Home games are played in the Salle Abderrahmane Bouânane, where there is capacity for 1,500 people.

Honours
Division Excellence
Champions (17): 1968, 1970, 1971, 1972, 1973, 1978, 1979, 1980, 1981, 1984, 1988, 1990, 1992, 1994, 1999, 2001, 2004
Moroccan Throne Cup
Champions (9): 1972, 1977, 1978, 1981, 1982, 1985, 1991, 2002, 2004

References

Basketball teams in Morocco
Basketball teams established in 1946
Sport in Rabat